Ardwell Irion is a Sint Maarten politician. He served as Minister of Finance in the first cabinet of Prime Minister Silveria Jacobs and, he serves in this role in her second cabinet.

References 

Living people
Year of birth missing (living people)
Place of birth missing (living people)
Finance ministers
21st-century Dutch politicians